Willard Jessie Brown (June 26, 1915 – August 4, 1996), nicknamed "Home Run" Brown, was an American baseball player who played outfielder in the Negro leagues for the Kansas City Monarchs and in Major League Baseball (MLB) for the St. Louis Browns. For the Monarchs, he led the Negro American League in hits for eight seasons (1937–39, 1941–43, 1946, 1948) and runs batted in (RBI) seven times during his career. His eight times leading a league in hits is tied with Ty Cobb for most in baseball history while his seven times leading in RBI for a league is tied for second-most in baseball history with Josh Gibson; Gibson and Brown also finished in the top two in batting average in five seasons each, most in Negro league history. He is a member of the National Baseball Hall of Fame and Museum.

Early life
Brown was born in Shreveport, Louisiana on 26 June 1915. He grew up in Natchitoches, Louisiana and in Shreveport. Brown's father was a mill laborer who became the owner of a cabinetmaking shop. Brown was a batboy in spring training for the Kansas City Monarchs, as the Negro league team held its workouts in Shreveport.

Baseball career
In , he signed with the Kansas City Monarchs, for which he would play in six out of the next eight years. A rookie season of 56 games played with a .379 batting average, ten home runs, 81 hits, and 60 RBI (for which he led the latter three categories) proved to be the beginning of a career full of raw power.

During his pre-war baseball years, he established himself as having the most raw power in Negro league history, and possibly in the history of baseball. He hit home runs more often than the better known Josh Gibson, causing Gibson to give Brown his nickname.

Brown was one of the fastest players in baseball in the late 1930s and 1940s, as well as a solid outfielder. From 1937 to 1946, Brown helped lead the Monarchs to six pennants in ten seasons. He finished second in batting average three times during this period (1937, 1939, 1943).

Brown left the Monarchs for the first time in 1940, swayed by the Mexican Leagues (as devised by Jorge Pasquel), who raided 63 players with the promise of more money ($1,000 per month); Brown played in Nuevo Laredo.

In the 1942 season, the Monarchs met the Negro National League champion Homestead Grays in the 1942 Negro World Series, the first Negro World Series between the Negro American League and the Negro National League since 1927. Brown stole a base in Game 2 and hit a home run in Game 3 while collecting seven hits in sixteen combined at-bats in four official games (an exhibition game and a game later not counted by the league was also played).

In the winter of 1941-42, he moved to the Puerto Rican leagues in Humacao. He also played parts of 1943-44 in the California Winter League. He served in the U.S. Army in 1944, seeing service in Europe before returning to the Monarchs in 1946. He batted .371 in 1947, leading the league for the first and only time.

MLB career 
On 20 July, Brown and Hank Thompson played against the Boston Red Sox. It was the first time that two black players appeared in an MLB game together.

Brown entered the baseball record books on August 13, 1947, when he became the first African-American player to hit a home run in the American League: an inside-the-park homer off Detroit Tigers pitcher and future Hall of Famer Hal Newhouser. Even throughout the season, Brown struggled because of the racism endemic in his new surroundings, as he hit .179 in just 21 games between July 19 and August 21 before he was released.

Later career
That winter, Brown went to Puerto Rico and had one of his greatest seasons ever, batting .432 with 27 home runs and 86 RBI in just 60 games, winning the Triple Crown and earning the nickname Ese Hombre or "That Man". He then won the Puerto Rican Winter League Triple Crown in the 1949–1950 season, and also hit for the cycle once in his career.

He returned to the Monarchs for the 1948 season (the last before the Negro leagues started to decline in terms of player quality). He played in 44 games and batted .404 while having 67 hits and 53 RBI, with the latter two topping the league totals once again (he finished second in batting average for the fourth and final time). His career home run total is not known, but he is considered to be among the Negro league career leaders in homers despite a relatively brief career.

He continued to play for a time with the Monarchs until the early 1950s while also still playing winter ball in Puerto Rico, where he won another Triple Crown in the winter of 1949-50. He played in Canada with the Border League for the Ottawa Nationals for a 30-game pennant run. He also played in the Caribbean Series in Venezuela along with summer ball in the Dominican Republic (1951–52). He then played in the Texas League and Western League from  through . He finished his Puerto Rico play in 1956-57; he batted .350 in his career there and was named to the Puerto Rican Baseball Hall of Fame in 1991. He played in 1957 for the Minot Mallards of the Manitoba-Dakota League before closing out his career barnstorming with the Monarchs in 1958. He then retired to his home in Houston.

Later life and legacy 
In addition, Brown also retired with the most times leading a league in Extra-base hits with eight, which still stands today. His record eight times leading a league in total bases was equaled by Hank Aaron.

After retiring from baseball, Brown was a long time resident of Houston, Texas, where he died in 1996 at the age of 81. He had been suffering from Alzheimer's disease for several years. He was featured on several baseball cards during his playing days including ones from Toleteros that were inserts in packages of tobacco. Buck O'Neil described Brown as the "most natural ballplayer I ever saw”.

Brown was elected to the Baseball Hall of Fame in 2006. The same year, he gained induction into the Caribbean Baseball Hall of Fame as part of their first class.

In 2013, the Bob Feller Act of Valor Award honored Brown as one of 37 Baseball Hall of Fame members for his service in the United States Army during World War II.

References

External links
 and Baseball-Reference Black Baseball, Mexican League, and Minor League stats and Seamheads

SABR Biography Project

1915 births
1996 deaths
African Americans in World War II
American expatriate baseball players in Canada
American expatriate baseball players in Mexico
United States Army personnel of World War II
Austin Senators players
Baseball outfielders
Baseball players from Shreveport, Louisiana
Burials at Houston National Cemetery
Cangrejeros de Santurce (baseball) players
Charros de Jalisco players
Dallas Eagles players
Houston Buffaloes players
Kansas City Monarchs players
Liga de Béisbol Profesional Roberto Clemente outfielders
Major League Baseball outfielders
Minot Mallards players
Monroe Monarchs players
National Baseball Hall of Fame inductees
Ottawa Nationals players
Rojos del Águila de Veracruz players
San Antonio Missions players
Sportspeople from Natchitoches, Louisiana
St. Louis Browns players
Tecolotes de Nuevo Laredo players
Topeka Hawks players
Tulsa Oilers (baseball) players
African-American United States Army personnel